Gustavo Martini Rissi (born 4 February 1998) is a Brazilian footballer who plays for Indy Eleven.

References

External links

Living people
1998 births
Association football defenders
Brazilian footballers
Brazilian expatriate footballers
Expatriate soccer players in the United States
Cruzeiro Esporte Clube players
Austin Bold FC players
USL Championship players
Brazilian expatriate sportspeople in the United States
Rochester New York FC players
MLS Next Pro players
Indy Eleven players